Hwang Yea-baang is a Taiwanese politician. He was the Secretary-General of the Examination Yuan.

Political careers
Hwang was promoted to be the secretary-general of Examination Yuan on 1 April 2010, succeeding Lin Shui-ji who resigned from the position due to health reasons. He was succeeded by Lee Jih-shyuan in August 2014.

References

Members of the Examination Yuan
Living people
Year of birth missing (living people)